James Wilfred Humble (10 May 1936 – 14 March 1985) was an English professional footballer who played in the Football League for Mansfield Town.

References

1936 births
1985 deaths
English footballers
Association football defenders
English Football League players
Ashington A.F.C. players
Mansfield Town F.C. players
Telford United F.C. players